Patras Kay Mazameen is a collection of short stories by Patras Bokhari, fist published in 1927. The book contains eleven humorous essays and is considered as a milestone in the humour of Urdu literature.

Synopsis 

The elevan essays are combination of humour and literary criticism, more in a social commentary style and are still relatable after passing almost a century.

The books contains the following eleven essays:

Background 

The book contains eleven essays which was written in the early 1930s century while some of them essays were written in 1920s also, during the author's stay at Government College, Lahore.

References 

1927 short story collections